DYVS (1233 AM) is a radio station owned and operated by the Far East Broadcasting Company. Its studio is located at Ground Floor, Smile Bldg., #79 San Sebastian St. cor. Verbena St., Bacolod and its transmitter are located at Brgy. Taloc, Bago, Negros Occidental.

References

Radio stations established in 1970
Radio stations in Bacolod
Catholic radio stations
Christian radio stations in the Philippines
1970 establishments in the Philippines
Far East Broadcasting Company